Alaa Nayrouz (born June 16, 1983 in Basra) is a coach and former international Iraqi football player, he played as a midfielder.

Nayrouz is currently working as assistant coach for Naft Al-Janoob club.

Honors
Al-Talaba
 Iraqi Premier League: 2001–02
 Iraq FA Cup: 2001–02
Erbil
 Iraqi Premier League: 2007–08

References

External links
 Profile on Mundial11.com
Al-Minaa Club: Sailors of south

1983 births
Living people
Association football midfielders
Iraqi footballers
Al-Mina'a SC players
Al-Talaba SC players
Nejmeh SC players
Expatriate footballers in Lebanon
Expatriate footballers in Syria
Expatriate footballers in Iran
Sportspeople from Basra
Iraq international footballers
Iraqi expatriate footballers
Iraqi expatriate sportspeople in Lebanon
Lebanese Premier League players
Syrian Premier League players